Ballophilus australiae is a species of centipede in the genus Ballophilus. It is found in Queensland, Australia. The original description of this species is based on a specimen measuring 38 mm in length with 75 pairs of legs.

References 

Ballophilidae
Centipedes of Australia
Endemic fauna of Australia
Taxa named by Ralph Vary Chamberlin